Jub Nesa (also Romanized as Jūb Nesā; also known as Jān Nesā and Jān Nesā’) is a village in Armand Rural District, in the Central District of Lordegan County, Chaharmahal and Bakhtiari Province, Iran. At the 2006 census, its population was 307, in 70 families.

References 

Populated places in Lordegan County